Infinity is a role-playing game published by The Infinity Company in 1979.

Description
Infinity is a universal system, with brief rules for character attributes, skills, and magic, plus more detailed rules for all sorts of movement (including vehicles) and combat.  The game is designed with rules that allow consistent movement and combat in any time period.

Publication history
Infinity was designed by Derrick Charbonnet and Terry Podgorski, and published by The Infinity Company in 1979 as a 36-page book.

Reception

Few copies were ever distributed. It received some positive reviews for being a "universal" role playing system, but few other positive reviews.

References

Role-playing games introduced in 1979
Universal role-playing games